Season twenty-five of Dancing with the Stars premiered on September 18, 2017, on the ABC network.

On November 21, 2017, actor and singer Jordan Fisher and Lindsay Arnold were crowned the champions, while violinist Lindsey Stirling and Mark Ballas finished in second place, and actor Frankie Muniz and Witney Carson finished in third.

Cast

Couples
Good Morning America announced the professional dancers who would be competing in the upcoming season. Alan Bersten, a troupe member since season 20, was promoted to pro. Drew Scott was announced as the first celebrity competing for the season, partnered with Emma Slater. On September 6, the rest of the cast was revealed on Good Morning America.

Hosts and judges
Tom Bergeron and Erin Andrews returned as hosts, while Carrie Ann Inaba, Len Goodman, and Bruno Tonioli returned as judges. Julianne Hough did not return as a permanent judge this season, though she did return as a guest judge during the first night of the finals. On October 23, singer Shania Twain joined the panel as a guest judge.

Dance troupe 
The dance troupe members for the season were former pros Sasha Farber and Jenna Johnson, and season 24 troupe members Artur Adamski, Brandon Armstrong, Hayley Erbert, and Britt Stewart.

Scoring charts

Notes

 : The couples were scored on a 40-point scale due to the presence of a guest judge.
 : This was the lowest score of the week.
 : This was the highest score of the week.
 :  This couple finished in first place.
 :  This couple finished in second place.
 :  This couple finished in third place.
 :  This couple was eliminated.

Highest and lowest scoring performances
The best and worst performances in each dance according to the judges' 30-point scale are as follows. Scores by guest judges are excluded.

Couples' highest and lowest scoring dances
Scores are based upon a potential 30-point maximum. Team dances and scores from guest judges are excluded.

Weekly scores
Individual judges' scores in the charts below (given in parentheses) are listed in this order from left to right: Carrie Ann Inaba, Len Goodman, Bruno Tonioli.

Week 1: First Dances
The couples danced the cha-cha-cha, foxtrot, salsa or tango. Couples are listed in the order they performed.

Week 2: Ballroom Night / Latin Night
The couples had to prepare two new dances to be performed on two consecutive nights. On Monday, the couples performed an unlearned ballroom routine, with one couple being eliminated at the end of the show. On Tuesday, the remaining couples performed an unlearned Latin routine, with another couple being eliminated. The Argentine tango, paso doble, quickstep, rumba, samba, Viennese waltz, and waltz were introduced. Couples are listed in the order they performed.

Night 1 (Ballroom)

Night 2 (Latin)

Week 3: Guilty Pleasures Night
The couples performed one unlearned dance to a song that reminded them of their secret guilty pleasure. The Charleston, jazz, and jive were introduced. Couples are listed in the order they performed.

At the start of the show, a moment of silence was held to honor the victims of the 2017 Las Vegas shooting, which had occurred the previous day. It was announced at the beginning of the show that, due to the tragedy, no elimination would take place.

Vanessa Lachey performed with Alan Bersten this week.

Week 4: Most Memorable Year Night
The couples danced one unlearned dance to celebrate the most memorable year of their lives. Contemporary was introduced. Couples are listed in the order they performed.

Week 5: Disney Night
The couples performed one unlearned dance to a song from a Disney film. All performances were chronological, based on when the couples' respective films were released.

Week 6: A Night at the Movies
Individual judges' scores in the chart below (given in parentheses) are listed in this order from left to right: Carrie Ann Inaba, Len Goodman, Shania Twain, Bruno Tonioli.

The couples performed one unlearned dance, capturing the spirit of a specific movie genre. Couples are listed in the order they performed.

Week 7: Halloween Night
The couples performed one unlearned dance and a team dance. Couples are listed in the order they performed. Two couples were eliminated at the end of the night.

Week 8: Quarterfinals
The couples performed an unlearned dance and a trio dance. The trio partners were past celebrity winners or finalists. Couples are listed in the order they performed.

Week 9: Semifinals
The couples performed an unlearned dance using music chosen by the pros, as well as a dance that reinterpreted an iconic routine from a previous season. Couples are listed in the order they performed.

Week 10: Finals
Individual judges' scores in the chart below (given in parentheses) are listed in this order from left to right: Carrie Ann Inaba, Len Goodman, Julianne Hough (Night 1 only), Bruno Tonioli.

On the first night, the couples performed a redemption dance and a freestyle. On the second night, the final three couples performed their favorite routine and a fusion dance of two styles. Couples are listed in the order they performed.

Night 1

Night 2

Dance chart 
The celebrities and professional partners danced one of these routines for each corresponding week:
 Week 1 (First Dances): One unlearned dance
 Week 2 (Night 1, Ballroom Night): One unlearned ballroom dance
 Week 2 (Night 2, Latin Night): One unlearned Latin dance
 Week 3 (Guilty Pleasures Night): One unlearned dance
 Week 4 (Most Memorable Year Night): One unlearned dance
 Week 5 (Disney Night): One unlearned dance
 Week 6 (A Night at the Movies): One unlearned dance
 Week 7 (Halloween Night): One unlearned dance & team dance
 Week 8 (Quarterfinals): One unlearned dance & trio dance
 Week 9 (Semifinals): Two unlearned dances
 Week 10 (Finals, Night 1): Redemption dance & freestyle
 Week 10 (Finals, Night 2): Favorite dance & fusion dance

Notes

 :  This was the highest scoring dance of the week.
 :  This was the lowest scoring dance of the week.
 :  This couple performed a dance, but received no scores.

Ratings

References

External links

Dancing with the Stars (American TV series)
2017 American television seasons